Anima Inferna is the fourth studio album by gothic/industrial metal band Gothminister. The album came in a standard jewel case, as well as the limited edition "Box From Hell" released in Germany, which came with a limited digipak version of Anima Inferna, a T-Shirt (available in M, L, XL sizes), and 32+1 Gothminister Drawpoker Gambling cards from Alterburger.

Track listing

Personnel

Band
Bjørn Alexander Brem - vocals
Eirik "Pezzmaur" Øien - bass
Ketil Eggum - guitar
Glenn Nilsen - guitar
Christian Svendsen - drums

Additional members
M.J.K. – Additional vocals (tracks: 2, 3, 6)

Production
Bjørn Alexander Brem - editing, programming, producer
Peder Kjellsby - programming
Neil Kernon - mixing
Alan Douches - mastering
Mina Winter - cover

References 

2011 albums
Gothminister albums